

Offseason

News and notes
May 25, 2011: Dartmouth goaltender Lindsay Holdcroft competed at the Warren Strelow National Team Goaltending Camp in Ann Arbor, Michigan. Holdcroft was one of six ECAC goaltenders to compete in the camp.
June 9, 2011: Holly Tyng has been promoted to associate head coach.
June 20, 2011: Former Dartmouth player Correne Bredin was named as a mentor and ambassador to help promote women's hockey as part of the IIHF Ambassador and Mentor Program (AMP).
August 19: Dartmouth head coach Mark Hudak was named an assistant coach for Team USA in the 2011 IIHF 12 Nations Tournament Series, Aug. 24-31, in Vierumäki, Finland.

Recruiting

Regular season
January 10: The Dartmouth Big Green and Providence Friars played each other in an outdoor game at Fenway Park in Boston. Providence skater Brooke Simpson scored her first career NCAA goal. With 1:14 remaining in regulation, Big Green forward Camille Dumais scored the game-winning goal on Providence netminder Genevieve Lacasse as the Big Green prevailed by a 3-2 mark.

Standings

Schedule

Conference record

Awards and honors
Camille Dumais, ECAC Player of the Week (Week of January 17, 2012)
Kelly Foley, ECAC Player of the Week (Week of October 24, 2011)
Lindsay Holdcroft, ECAC Player of the Week (Week of October 31, 2011)
Sally Komarek, ECAC Player of the Week (Week of November 28, 2011)
Ali Winkel, ECAC Player of the Week (Week of November 14, 2011)

References

Dartmouth Big Green women's ice hockey seasons
Dartmouth
Big
Big